Thondan is a 2017 Indian Tamil-language vigilante drama film written and directed by Samuthirakani. The film stars Samuthirakani himself, with Vikranth, Sunaina, Arthana Binu, Gouri Nair, and Namo Narayana amongst others in pivotal roles. The music is composed by Justin Prabhakaran with editing by A. L. Ramesh. The venture began production in December 2016 and had a theatrical release on 26 May 2017.

Plot 
Narayanan (Namo Narayana) is the son of Central Minister Pandiyanar (G. Gnanasambandam). Narayanan uses his father's name to make money by corruption, much to the latter's dismay. One day, some goons try to kill a man in daylight, as instructed by Narayanan. The man is lying in a pool of blood, and a local person witnesses this and informs this to the ambulance. The ambulance driver is Maha Vishnu (Samuthirakani), a kindhearted man who has never let anyone whom he has taken in his ambulance die. Vishnu admits the man in the hospital, and he is saved. Narayanan is angry with Vishnu for saving his enemy, for which he replies that saving the lives of people is his duty.

Vishnu is married to Bagalamugi (Sunaina). He has a father (Vela Ramamoorthy) and sister Mahishasuramardini (Arthana Binu). The latter is stalked by Vicky (Vikranth), a drunkard and jobless youth who happens to be a friend of Vishnu. Vishnu convinces Vicky to reform and attend the medical technician course. Vicky completes it successfully and saves people's lives, earning the love of Vishnu and his family. Mahi has a friend named Gowri (Gouri Nair), who is stalked by Narayanan's brother Chinna Pandi (Soundararaja), and she beats him in a bus. Insulted by this, Chinna Pandi beats Gowri up with a wooden log. Enraged, Mahi and the students kill him. Vishnu arrives with his ambulance to admit Chinna Pandi to the hospital. To avoid traffic, he takes the outer bypass, infuriating Narayanan. Chinna Pandi succumbs to the injury. Narayanan blames Vishnu for this and beats him up, but he is saved by the public. Narayanan vows to kill Vishnu.

Vishnu gets mad after his father loses his hearing ability and his wife suffers a miscarriage. Deeply saddened by this, he confronts Narayanan, who pleads that he is innocent. Vishnu believes that being a common man, he cannot do anything against a powerful man who has political support. Narayanan bribes Inspector Uthaman (Anil Murali) and three government officials and has them under his control. Vishnu is helped by Sub-Inspector Rahman (Poraali Dileepan). Vishnu plans to destroy Narayanan and bring him to justice. He gathers all the details of the properties owned by Narayanan and a video footage of him insulting Uthaman and the government officials while bribing from Narayanan's auditor, who helps Vishnu because he once saved his wife's life. Vishnu realizes that Narayanan used Pandiyanar's name to earn huge amounts of money and buy so many properties by corruption. Vishnu sends the evidences them to IT, Vigilance, and other departments. He also sends the video footage to Uthaman's wife and the government officials' wives, who lose respect among their family. Uthaman and the government officials decide to stop supporting Narayanan for his further actions.

The IT department raids Narayanan's house, confiscates all of his belongings, and arrests him. Narayanan tries to escape but meets with an accident. While he is struggling, Vishnu comes with his ambulance and saves him.

Cast 

 Samuthirakani as Maha Vishnu, an ambulance driver
 Vikranth as Vicky, Vishnu's friend and Mahi's love interest
 Sunaina as Bagalamugi, Vishnu's wife
 Arthana Binu as Mahishasuramardini (Mahi), Vishnu's sister and Vicky's love interest
 Gouri Nair as Gowri, Mahi's friend and chinna pandi's love interest
 Namo Narayana as Narayanan, the main antagonist
 Ganja Karuppu as Xavier, Vishnu's assistant
 Vela Ramamoorthy as Vishnu and Mahi's father
 Anil Murali as Inspector Uthaman, a bribe victim of Narayanan
 Poraali Dileepan as Sub-Inspector Rahman, Vishnu's friend 
 G. Gnanasambandam as Pandiyanar, Narayanan's father
 Soundararaja as Chinna Pandi, Narayanan's brother
 Badava Gopi as Unnmai TV Reporter Aryabhatham
 Erode Gopal as Sikkal Shanmugasundaram, Bagalamugi's father
 Indrani as Pandiyanar's wife
 Nasath as Vaikuntham, Bagalamugi's younger brother 
 Pichaikkaran Moorthy
 Nithya Ravindran
 Baboos
 V. Murugavel
 Soori as "Ilaikadai" Ramar (guest appearance)
 Thambi Ramaiah as Income Tax Officer (guest appearance)

Production 
In May 2016, Samuthirakani revealed that he was set to work with Jayam Ravi for the second time after Nimirndhu Nil on a project titled Thondan, using a script that he had initially written for Sasikumar. He stated that production would begin by the end of the year, with Allari Naresh also selected to play a role. However Jayam Ravi's busy schedule during 2016 and 2017 meant that the pair could not eventually work together.

The film re-materialised during December 2016, with Vikranth signed on to portray the role originally assigned to Naresh, while Samuthirakani himself would play the lead role. Vikranth revealed that he would star in the project alongside commitments to work in Suseenthiran's ventures Vennila Kabaddi Kuzhu 2 and Nenjil Thunivirundhal. Samuthirakani stated the film would be about "simple men, their lives, problems and pain" and "these are people who provide a service to the society; they might earn a less salaries, but they definitely get more satisfaction out of life". He added that the film would tackle several social issues in India including demonetisation, corruption in politics, the farmers' plight, jallikattu and the harassment of women. Production began during early December 2016, with Sunaina added to the cast after Samuthirakani was impressed with her performance in Neerparavai (2012).

Soundtrack 

The film's music was composed by Justin Prabhakaran and featured five songs. The album was released on 9 April 2017 through Yuvan Shankar Raja's U1 Records label.

Release 
The film had a theatrical release across Tamil Nadu on 26 May 2017, alongside Radha Mohan's Brindavanam (2017 film), and earned mixed to negative reviews. The satellite rights of the film were sold to Zee Tamil. Baradwaj Rangan of Film Companion wrote "All of which would be okay...if there was a grain of good filmmaking. But the utterly generic bring-down-the-bad-guy story is preposterous, and scenes go on and on."

Reception
Anupama Subramaniam of the Deccan Chronicle wrote Thondan is an "interesting film sans entertainment values" and "all is well and good, but things do become a bit self-righteous and annoying when a fictional film begins to give you lessons on ethics and morality". India Today's review stated that "Thondan is Samuthirakani's TED Talk in Tamil that runs for more than two hours", adding that it is "an uninteresting social commentary". On a positive note, film critic Santhosh Mathevan wrote, "Kani documents a lot of true events, and he also comes out with some real time and cinematic references in his screenplay." He also criticised, "Usually, the mercury level of preaching would always touch the peak of thermometer in every of Kani's movie. But, Thondan has let the mercury bulb burst, as the film seems to be a 138 minute-tight-pack of loads of moral values to teach." Sify.com stated the film was "filled with a plethora of messages in an over preachy tone". A critic from The New Indian Express wrote the film was "a basket of moral lectures", concluding "Thondan is what you feared would happen once Appa (2016) did as well as it did". Baradwaj Rangan rated the film 1 out of 5 and wrote, "As expected, actor and director Samuthirakani, delivers yet another sermon disguised as a movie". The film took a lukewarm opening at the Chennai box office and fared averagely commercially.

References

External links 
 

2017 films
2010s Tamil-language films
Indian vigilante films
Films shot in Chennai
Films directed by Samuthirakani
Indian drama films
Films about social issues in India
Films scored by Justin Prabhakaran
2017 drama films